TownNews.com is a digital media and online publishing company based in Moline, Illinois. The company's products include the BLOX CMS which is commonly used by American newspaper websites.

History
The company was founded by Marc Wilson, Virginia R. Wilson, and Robert P. Dalton as the International Newspaper Network (INN) in 1989 to help newspapers deal with developing technology.  over 1,600 newspapers, magazines, radio stations, and TV stations use TownNews.com's products.

Products
The company's lead product is the BLOX CMS (content management system), which is widely used to produce online and print products. Customers include Lee Enterprises, Berkshire-Hathaway Media, Digital First Media, Adams Publishing Group, Pioneer Newspaper Group, the Evening Post Publishing, and many other groups and independent publications.

Organization
TownNews.com is headquartered in Moline, Illinois. Executives added since 2000 include CEO Brad Ward, head programmer Patrick O'lone, systems chief Chris Murley, controller Darcy Heist, and national sales VP Rick Rogers. Marc Wilson became executive chairman in October 2016 after serving as chief executive since the company's founding.

Lee Enterprises, the fourth-largest newspaper group in the United States is an 82.5% stakeholder of TownNews.com. The Wilsons  remain minority partners. Lee Enterprises became the majority partner in 1996.

Acquisitions
Over the years, TownNews.com has acquired various organizations, most notably ZWire, AdQuest, Anytime News, and DotConnect Media.

See also
 Cxense

References

External links
 

Publishing companies established in 1989
Online publishing companies of the United States
Newspaper companies of the United States
Software companies based in Illinois
Business software companies
Companies based in Rock Island County, Illinois
Software companies of the United States